Take Me to the Land of Hell is the 2013 album by Yoko Ono's band Plastic Ono Band. It is her fifteenth solo album overall and Ono's third since reforming the Plastic Ono Band in 2009 with her son Sean Lennon. It features guests Yuka C Honda, Keigo "Cornelius" Oyamada, Hirotaka "Shimmy" Shimizu, Yuko Araki, Nels Cline, Tune-Yards, Questlove, Ad-Rock & Mike D, Michael Leonhart, Bill Dobrow, Jared Samuel, Shahzad Ismaily, Lenny Kravitz, Andrew Wyatt, Erik Friedlander, Lois Martin, Joyce Hammann, Thomas Bartlett, Douglas Wieselman, Julian Lage, Toyoaki Mishima, Toru Takayama, Christopher Sean Powell, Christopher Allen, Andre Kellman, Michael H. Brauer, Bob Ludwig, Kevin Harper, Mark Bengston, Geoff Thorpe and Greg Kadel.

Background
The album was produced by Sean Lennon. Throughout the fall of 2012 he posted on social media about recording the album with Cline, Lage, Cornelius, tUnE-yArDs and Kravitz. In early 2013 Lennon announced the album was ready to be mixed, and that it would be released that year to tie in with Ono's 80th birthday. In June 2013 the lead single "Moonbeams" was released as a free download for pre-order customers. Every Monday an additional new track was streamed for free starting in August, leading up to its 17 September 2013 release.

Reception

British newspaper The Sunday Times gave a positive review of the album, stating that over her career Yoko has "ruthlessly [pursued] her own vision" and on this album "no one outshines Yoko" from the guest list. The paper additionally noted the "stunning chorus" of "7th Floor" and felt that Yoko was a "pretty balladeer" on "There's No Goodbye Between Us".

Track listing

Personnel
 Yoko Ono – vocals (all tracks except 13)
 Sean Ono Lennon – acoustic guitar (8), bass (1, 2, 6, 7, 14), conductor (11), drum machine (5), drum programming (1), electric guitar (2, 3), guitar (1, 9, 14), kalimba (5), keyboards (14), percussion (8, 12, 14), piano (3, 6, 9, 10), shakers (5), sound design (14), synthesizer (1, 2, 3, 5, 6, 7), vocals (6)
 Adam Horowitz – additional beats, programming and "other curve balls" (4)
 Andrew Wyatt – Rhodes (8)
 Bill Dubrow – drums (11), percussion (1, 7, 11)
 Christopher Sean Powell – percussion (1)
 Erik Friedlander – cello (9, 10), string arrangement (10)
 Hirotaka "Shimmy" Shimizu – electric guitar (1, 6, 7, 8, 12), guitars (14)
 Jared Samuel – B3 (7, 8), percussion (8), synthesizer (7)
 Joyce Hammann – violin (10)
 Julian Lage – acoustic guitar (11)
 Keigo Oyamada – bass (12), electric guitar (7, 12), iPad (14), Kaoss synthesizer (1), synthesizer (12)
 Kevin Harper – bottle (3)
 Lenny Kravitz – drums (2), Clavinet (2)
 Lois Martin – viola (10)
 Merrill Garbus – bottle (3), drums (3, 5), percussion (3, 5), Rhodes (5), voice (3, 5)
 Michael Leonhart – Mellophones (6), percussion (8)
 Mike D – additional beats, programming and "other curve balls" (4)
 Nate Brenner – bass (3, 5), bottle (3), percussion (3), voice (5)
 Nels Cline – electric guitar (1, 6, 7, 8), guitars (14), lap steel (8), loops (6), percussion (8)
 Questlove – drums (7)
 Shahzad Ismaily – acoustic guitar (8), bass (8), guitar (14), percussion (8), sound design (14)
 Thomas Bartlett – piano (11)
 Toyoaki Mishima – manipulator (12)
 Yuka C. Honda – BW piano loops (6), keyboards (8, 14), Rhodes (1, 6), sampler (1, 5), sound design (14), synthesizer (5, 6), additional drum programming (14)
 Yuko Araki – drums (1, 6, 8, 12, 14), percussion (12, 14), synthesizer (3)
 "Bad Dancer" remixed by Adam Horowitz and Mike D
 "Shine, Shine" remixed by Cornelius

Technical personnel
 Recorded at Sear Sound by Christopher Allen
 Mixed by Michael H. Brauer for MHB Prods
 Mixed at Electric Lady Studios
 Mastered by Bob Ludwig at Gateway Mastering
 Kevin Harper – Assistant Engineer
 Mark Bengston – Pro Tools Engineer and Assistant
 Geoff Thorpe – Art Director
 Greg Kadel – Cover Photography
 Sean Ono Lennon – Studio Photos
 Yoko Ono – Drawings
 Andre Kellman – Mix Engineer at Oscilloscope Laboratories (4)
 Toru Takayama – Additional Engineer (12)

Release history

References

External links
 

Yoko Ono albums
2013 albums
Plastic Ono Band albums